Hwangju County is a county in North Hwanghae province, North Korea.

Geography
Hwangju is bordered to the northwest by Sariwŏn, to the northeast by Songrim and Kangnam, to the southwest by Yŏnt'an, to the south by Pongsan, and to the southeast by Ŭnch'ŏn

History
During the Joseon Dynasty, Hwangju was one of the most important cities in the area, leading to the first character of its name to be used in naming North Hwanghae Province. In 1930 its importance increased when Songrim, then a township of Hwangju County, was promoted to town status and renamed Kyomipo (Kenjiho in Japanese). There, the Japanese built a flourishing steel plant, which brought much prosperity to Hwangju. In 1947 Songrim was separated from Hwangju and made a city; since then, the county has been mostly agricultural. The old core of the city is still surrounded by its ancient walls.

Climate
Kumchon had a fairly severe climate, with an average temperature of 10.2 degrees. Inland, the average January temperature is -7 degrees, while the average August temperature is 25.6 degrees. The county receives an average of 1,100mm of rain per year.

Transportation
The county is served by the Pyongbu Railway Line, which stops in at Hwangju Station. There is also a highway which runs through Hwangju Town.

Administrative divisions
The county is divided into one town (ŭp) and 14 villages (ri).

See also
Geography of North Korea
Administrative divisions of North Korea

References

Counties of North Hwanghae